Oleg Borisovich Juravlyov (born May 17, 1982 in Tashkent) is an Uzbekistani sprinter. He is a two-time national champion for the 100 and 200 metres, and also, a member of the national sprint relay team at the 2000 Summer Olympics in Sydney.

Juravlyov represented Uzbekistan at the 2008 Summer Olympics in Beijing, where he competed for the men's 200 metres. He ran in the fifth heat against eight other athletes, including Jamaican track star Usain Bolt, who eventually won the gold medal in the final. He finished the sprint race in eighth place by approximately half a second (0.51) behind Lebanon's Mohamad Siraj Tamim, with a time of 22.31 seconds. He failed to advance to the quarterfinals, as he placed sixtieth overall and was ranked below three mandatory slots for the next round.

References

External links

NBC 2008 Olympics profile

Uzbekistani male sprinters
Living people
Olympic athletes of Uzbekistan
Athletes (track and field) at the 2000 Summer Olympics
Athletes (track and field) at the 2008 Summer Olympics
Sportspeople from Tashkent
1982 births